Dorothy Swann McAuliffe (born May 2, 1963) is an American attorney who is serving as the U.S. State Department’s Special Representative for Global Partnerships. She previously was the First Lady of the Commonwealth of Virginia from January 2014 to January 2018.

Early life and education

McAuliffe was born Dorothy Swann on May 2, 1963 to Richard and Doris Swann. She graduated from the Catholic University of America with a Bachelors of Arts in Political Science in 1985 and from the Georgetown University Law Center.

Career

Early career

McAuliffe practiced banking and security law for several years and worked for the law firms of Thompson & Mitchell and Heron Burchette Ruckerett & Rothwell.

First Lady of Virginia

McAuliffe was the first Virginia first lady to set up an office in the Patrick Henry Building, where cabinet secretaries and agency heads work.

As First Lady of Virginia, McAuliffe launched and advocated for anti-hunger programs and food access initiatives in the state. In 2014, Terry McAuliffe created the Commonwealth Council on Bridging the Nutritional Divide and named Dorothy McAuliffe head of the council. Dorothy McAuliffe also advocated for several programs to feed hungry children in schools, including a Breakfast after the Bell program, which made breakfast part of the school day, and programs that provided summer and after school meals for students with food insecurity.

McAuliffe also advocated for the creation of the Virginia Grocery Investment Fund, a fund set up to attract supermarkets to food deserts across the state. McAuliffe served on the Virginia Council on the Interstate Compact on Educational Opportunity for Military Children, which helps military children integrate into new schools due to frequent moves while their parents are serving in the military.

In 2016, McAuliffe initiated and led the effort for the addition of a disability ramp to Virginia's Governor's Executive Mansion.

Later career

Non-profit work

Dorothy has served on the boards of FoodCorps, the John F. Kennedy Center for the Performing Arts, and the Smithsonian Institution. After her term as First Lady of Virginia ended, McAuliffe joined Share Our Strength as the National Policy Advisor for the No Kid Hungry VA campaign.

Politics

In 2018, McAuliffe considered running for the Democratic nomination to challenge Rep. Barbara Comstock (R) for the U.S. House of Representatives in Virginia's 10th congressional district, but ultimately decided not to.

In 2020, McAuliffe advocated for the passage of a bill in Virginia that would allow workers up to 12 weeks of paid leave after the birth or adoption of a child, or to take care of a sick family member.

On 3 June 2022, it was announced that McAuliffe was appointed as the Special Representative for Global Partnerships by President Joe Biden.

Academics

She was a spring 2018 fellow at the Georgetown Institute of Politics and Public Service.

Personal life 
McAuliffe married Terry McAuliffe on October 8, 1988. They have five children.

References

Catholic University of America alumni
First Ladies and Gentlemen of Virginia
Georgetown University Law Center alumni
Living people
Virginia Democrats
Year of birth missing (living people)
21st-century American women